Al-Waleed Ibrahim Abdulla, born 5 July 1984) is a Qatari sprinter who specializes in the 100 metres.

References

1984 births
Living people
Qatari male sprinters
Athletes (track and field) at the 2002 Asian Games
Athletes (track and field) at the 2006 Asian Games
Asian Games medalists in athletics (track and field)
Asian Games bronze medalists for Qatar
Medalists at the 2002 Asian Games